The Lake Izvorul Muntelui, also known as Lake Bicaz, is the largest artificial lake on the interior waters of Romania; it was created after the completion of a dam built on the river Bistrița. The dam is located a few kilometers north of the town of Bicaz.

The dam was built between 1950 and 1960 and is used to generate hydroelectricity at the Bicaz-Stejaru Hydroelectric Power Station.

The lake is a tourist destination in the region, especially in summertime, when visitors take the ferryboat from the Bicaz port for a short trip on the lake, and to view Mount Ceahlău on the west shore.

In the 1960s and 1970s there was regular ferry service between the Bicaz port and the villages on the lake shore.

At Potoci, a few kilometers north of the town of Bicaz, there is a biological research facility, equipped with a small submersible used for underwater explorations. The facility was visited by the marine biologist Jacques-Yves Cousteau in 1984.

Notes

Bicaz
RIzvorul Muntelui
Bicaz
Tourist attractions in Neamț County
Izvorul Muntelui